Catherine Conconne (born 18 May 1963) is a politician from Martinique. She was elected to the French Senate to represent Martinique in the 2017 French Senate election, and was the first woman senator for Martinique.

References

1963 births
Living people
Martiniquais politicians
Martiniquais women in politics
French Senators of the Fifth Republic 
Members of the Assembly of Martinique
Senators of Martinique
Women members of the Senate (France)
21st-century French women politicians